Girvan railway station is a railway station serving the town of Girvan, South Ayrshire, Scotland. The station is managed by ScotRail, who operate all passenger services from there. It has two platforms and is the location of one of the five passing loops on the single track line between Dalrymple Junction (south of Ayr) and Stranraer. Immediately south of the station, the line climbs steeply towards Pinmore tunnel – the climb is known as the Glendoune Bank and has a ruling gradient of 1 in 54.

History 
The station was opened on 5 October 1877 by the Girvan and Portpatrick Junction Railway and was known as Girvan New, replacing the Girvan (Old) terminus station of the Maybole and Girvan Railway situated nearby. The station closed on 7 February 1882, reopened 1 August 1883, closed 12 April 1886, reopened 18 June 1886, closed again 2 September 1886, reopened 14 July 1890, and was renamed Girvan on 1 April 1893 after rebuilding by the Glasgow and South Western Railway, who had taken over the G&PJR the previous year.  From 1906–1942, it also served as the southern terminus of the Maidens and Dunure Light Railway.

The main station building caught fire in January 1946 and because the London, Midland and Scottish Railway (LMS) were not disposed to finance the rebuilding costs as nationalisation was imminent, rebuilding did not commence until 1949.  Owing to shortage of materials it was not completed until August 1951, when based on a typical 1930s LMS design it was re-opened. Along with the signal box, it is a category B listed structure as an example of an early post-war railway station in the Moderne style in Scotland. The station clock restored in 2009 is believed to be from the original station building.

The station is part of the South West Scotland Community Rail Partnership which comprises local Community Councils, representation from South Ayrshire Council, ScotRail as well as private individuals. SWSCRP has adopted the station and has provided tubs, shrubs and plants. These are tended to by the Girvan Make it Happen Group. SWSCRP also have their community shop and an office on site.

The station was the rail head for the 2009 UK Open Golf Championships.

Services 

2022
On Monday to Saturday, there is a typically hourly service to/from Ayr, 6 trains of which continue to Kilmarnock with eight running the other way (and one train is extended to Glasgow Central).
 
There are 5 trains per day southbound to Stranraer which operate every to an irregular 2 or 4 hour frequency. On Sundays, there are 5 trains a day each way to both Ayr and Stranraer.

References

Bibliography

External links

Girvan Railway Station

Railway stations in South Ayrshire
Railway stations in Great Britain opened in 1877
SPT railway stations
Railway stations served by ScotRail
Category B listed buildings in South Ayrshire
Former Glasgow and South Western Railway stations
Girvan